The automotive industry in Croatia employs about 10,000 people in over 130 companies. AD Klaster, members of the Croatian Association of Automotive Parts Manufacturers at the Industry sector of the Croatian chamber of economy employs about 6000 employees and generates profit of about US$600 million. There are also other companies which are not a part of AD Klaster, like AVL, Cetitec, Saint Jean Industries, König metal, Lipik Glas, Nexus, Yazaki, LTH, Multinorm, Institut RT-RK, Galo industries, and others.

Croatia mostly produces automotive parts and software for foreign market, primarily the European Union and the European automotive industry. Two most prominent car manufacturers in Croatia are DOK-ING and Rimac Automobili, while Crobus produces buses. The automotive industry accounts for approximately 1.8 per cent of all Croatian exports, while 90 per cent of profits in the industry itself are derived from exports.

Automotive parts manufacturers in Croatia are well-integrated into the global parts supply chain, such as AD Plastik, which produces for BMW, Citroen, Dacia, Fiat, Ford, Mitsubishi, Nissan, Opel, Peugeot, Renault, Volkswagen, and other vehicle manufacturers  or Lipik Glas, which supplies windscreens to Aston Martin, Alfa Romeo, Bentley, Ferrari, London Electric Vehicle Company, McLaren and Spyker.

History 

Between and after the two World Wars, a number of automotive companies and manufacturing plants emerged: Tvornica motora Zagreb (TMZ) and Tvornica Autobusa Zagreb (TAZ), both based in Zagreb.

Tvornica Autobusa Zagreb started producing buses and trucks in 1930. In 1980, the factory employed 1,200 people and produced an average of 500–600 vehicles (up to 900) yearly. Buses were exported to China, Finland, Egypt and other countries. The company also produced motorcycles until it went defunct in 2000. Other companies, such as Đuro Đaković have been producing military vehicles, such as M-95 Degman tank and LOV-1 armored vehicle. The company also manufactured Patria AMV vehicles under license. Rijeka-based vehicle manufacturer Torpedo produced military trucks, used in Croatian War of Independence during the 90s.

In 1992 and 1994 two companies, Zlatko and Kwadi both created a single car each. Zlatko's prototype: the Kosmopolit in 1994 was damaged during shipping and was abandoned. The 1992 Kwadi CR3 however is thought to be owned by Tomislav Sekulic who has looked after the car for the previous thirty years. The Kwadi CR3 is considered to be the first Croatian car in the countries history. (Tvornica Autobusa Zagreb producing the first automobiles).

Restaurant and brewery owner IPIM d.o.o. launched a truck based on the Kia K2700 in 2003. Designed for promotional purposes, the vehicle featured a retro-styled, stainless steel body and a 2.7 liter engine producing 80 horsepower. It retailed for €42,500 and was mainly exported to other European countries.

Croatia produced its first electric city concept car DOK-ING Loox in 2012. The first car was sold to the Zagreb Faculty of Engineering. In 2015, the company produced two electric buses for the city of Koprivnica as part of the project Civitas Dyn@mo. In the following years, the company began producing a variety of electric vehicles such as communal vehicles, buses, mopeds and bikes for foreign markets.

In 2013, Croatian bus manufacturer CROBUS signed a 2.1 billion Croatian kuna deal to produce and export 2,000 buses to Iraq, with the first buses delivered in the same year.

The same year, privately owned Rimac Automobili produced Rimac Concept One, a two-seat high-performance electric sports car. Concept One has been described as the world's first electric supercar becoming the world's fastest accelerating electric automobile until 2015. The car was exported during the same year, and was the first car exported abroad in the country's history. As of 2016, all of the eight Concept Ones manufactured were sold. The company subsequently unveiled the improved Rimac Concept S at the 2015 Geneva Motor Show. The company's subsidiary Greyp Bikes also started mass production and export of its own brand of high performance electric bikes. Greyp dealerships were opened in countries such as United Kingdom, Switzerland, Norway, and Luxembourg. The Rimac group also produces and manufactures engines and other electrical parts for other companies, such as the liquid cool battery pack for Koenigsegg, claimed as the most power-dense battery pack to date. In 2017, they were producing battery systems for Aston Martin. It also produces entire vehicles for other companies, such as the Applus Volar-E for Applus+ IDIADA.

Manufacturers
Rimac Automobili
Dok-Ing Automotiv
Đuro Đaković
CROBUS
IPIM

Defunct
Tvornica Autobusa Zagreb
Zlatko (Car Brand)
Kwadi

See also
 Industry of Croatia
 Economy of Croatia

References

External links
 Automobilski sektor u Hrvatskoj namijenjen je izvozu
 Otvorena prva hrvatska tvornica autobusa Crobus!
 Megaprojekt na sjeveru Hrvatske - četiri županije gradit će tvornicu automobila

Croatia
Industry in Croatia